The Vienna Woods are forested highlands that form the northeastern foothills of the Northern Limestone Alps in the states of Lower Austria and Vienna. The  and  range of hills is heavily wooded and a popular recreation area with the Viennese.

Location
The Vienna Woods are bounded by the rivers Triesting, Gölsen, Traisen and Danube, and are on the border of the Mostviertel and the Industrieviertel, two of the four quarters of Lower Austria. Reaching into the city of Vienna itself, they are a favourite outdoor destination for the densely populated area around the city.

Geography

Important rivers in the Vienna Woods are the Wien, the Schwechat and the Triesting. The northeasternmost Leopoldsberg overlooking the Danube and the Vienna Basin forms the eastern end of the Alpine chain.

Even though the Vienna Woods are a protected landscape and important recreational area, they are threatened by urban sprawl. The Lainzer Tiergarten, an extensive park populated by the wild boar and other woodland animals, as well as the Schwarzenbergpark, were created on the territory of the city of Vienna during the 19th century. The natural park Sandstein-Wienerwald is near Purkersdorf, some 20 km (12 mi) west of Vienna. There are also some caves, such as the Dreidärrischenhöhle ("cave of the three deaf men").

Geology
The mountain ranges of the Vienna Woods are the transition between the Eastern Alps and the Carpathians, separated by the Danube and some tectonic lines near Vienna. The northern area is part of the Alps' sandstone zone, while its south is part of the Northern Limestone Alps. In the east, the border is the thermal line, which forms a geological break line to the Viennese Basin. Beeches, oaks and hornbeams grow throughout the north of the Wienerwald forest; in the south are conifers, mostly pines and firs.  The Föhrenberge (Pine Mountains)  natural park is in the latter region.

History
The Vienna Woods have probably been populated since the 8th century. The Vienna Woods was the royal hunting grounds from the 11th century until 1850. Under the influence of the Avars, a Slavic population settled here after the Völkerwanderung, which may account for village names such as Döbling, Liesing or Gablitz. From the 16th century onwards forestry was practised. Industrial development beginning circa 1840 encouraged increased settlement of the area.

Through the northern part of the Vienna Woods (from Tulln an der Donau), a march of Polish troops of King Jan III Sobieski took place, which were to help Vienna in September 1683.

In 1870, plans were brought forward to clear most of the forest, but this caused widespread public resistance, in which Josef Schöffel was one of the most important figures.
In 1987, the governors of the states of Vienna, Lower Austria and Burgenland signed the Vienna Woods Declaration to protect nature in the region.

See also
"Tales from the Vienna Woods", a waltz by Johann Strauss II, as well as a play by Ödön von Horváth, and several film adaptations of the play

References

External links

 Austrian Biosphere Reserves
 360° × 180° panoramic image of the Wienerwald (QuickTime needed)
 Natural Park Sparbach
 Vienna Woods Tourism Information

German language links
 Biosphere Park Wienerwald
 Natural Park of the Föhrenberge 
 Natural Park of Sandstein-Wienerwald 
 Wienerwald (Vienna Woods) – Flora + Fauna 

 
Forests and woodlands of Austria
Hills of Austria
Mountain ranges of the Alps
Mountain ranges of Lower Austria
Geography of Lower Austria
Geography of Vienna
Northern Limestone Alps
Biosphere reserves of Austria
Baden District, Austria
Döbling
Hietzing
Klosterneuburg
Liesing
Penzing (Vienna)
Sankt Pölten-Land District
Wien-Umgebung District
Tourist attractions in Lower Austria
Tourist attractions in Vienna